Arunachal Pradesh Football Association (APFA) is the state governing body of football in Arunachal Pradesh. It is affiliated with the All India Football Federation, the national governing body. APFA runs Arunachal Super League, the top tier league of the state.

Competitions

Men's
 Indrajit Namchoom Arunachal League
 Tadar Tang State Level Football Tournament

Women's
 Arunachal Women’s Football Championship

References

Football in Arunachal Pradesh
Football governing bodies in India
1992 establishments in Arunachal Pradesh
Sports organizations established in 1992